Maurice Vaussard (8 September 1888 – 24 February 1978) was a 20th-century French writer and essayist.

He was awarded numerous prizes by the Académie française.

Prizes 
1922: Prix Bordin for L’intelligence catholique dans l’Italie au XXe siècle
1926: Prix Montyon for Sainte Marie-Madeleine de Pazzi (1566–1607)
1951: Prix d’Académie for Histoire de l’Italie contemporaine
1959: Prix Louis Barthou for ensemble de son œuvre
1962: Prix Broquette-Gonin (literature) for ensemble de son œuvre
1967: Prix du Rayonnement de la langue et de la littérature françaises
1974: Prix de l’Académie for ensemble de ses travaux historiques

He is buried in the 29th division of the Père-Lachaise Cemetery.

Bibliography 
 Ilaria Biagioli, Maurice Vaussard. Un cristiano e l'eresia nazionalista, in Cattolicesimo e totalitarismo. Chiese e culture religiose tra le due guerre mondiali (Italia, Spagna, Francia), a cura di Daniele Menozzi e Renato Moro, Brescia, Morcelliana, 2004.

External links 
 Nouvelles perspectives après l’ouverture à gauche on Le Monde diplomatique
 Maurice Vaussard, Histoire de l'Italie contemporaine (1870–1946) on Persée
 Maurice Vaussard on the site of the Académie française

Winners of the Prix Broquette-Gonin (literature)
20th-century French writers
20th-century French essayists
20th-century French historians
French nationalists
People from Somme (department)
1888 births
1978 deaths
Burials at Père Lachaise Cemetery